Regiment March (Turkish: Alay Marşı)  is the march of Special Forces Command of Turkey. The Soldier's Anthem (Əsgər Marşı) of the Azerbaijani Land Forces was inspired by the march.

Lyrics

See also 
Special Forces Command (Turkey)
Combat Search and Rescue (Turkish Armed Forces)
March (music)

External links 
1937 version 
Əsgər Marşı

Turkish songs
Turkish military marches